Katarzyna Małgorzata Figura (born 22 March 1962) is a Polish film, theatre and television actress. She is sometimes billed as "Kasia Figura", as in Prêt-à-Porter, Robert Altman's 1994 film.

Career 

Figura was born in Warsaw, Poland. She graduated from the National Academy of Dramatic Art in Warsaw and continued her studies at the Parisian Conservatoire d'Art Dramatique. She is one of the most recognized and popular actresses in the contemporary Polish film industry. She often played blond bombshells, prostitutes, and wives of rich men. Recently, she has changed her image radically in favor of more mature characters, very often sorrowful and embittered.

Katarzyna Figura still appears in TV shows. For many years, she has been featured in single episodes of popular sitcoms, and has regularly appeared in the show Witches (since 2005). In 2004, she made her come-back to theater after a long-term absence. Her role in Alina to the West by Paweł Miśkiewicz in the Warsaw Drama Theater was highly regarded by the critics. She shaved her head for that role, consequently breaking from her sex symbol image.
She played in Teatr Współczesny between 1985 and 1988. Branded a Polish Marilyn Monroe after her role in Radosław Piwowarski's film Pociąg do Hollywood (1987), her first big part. She lost out for roles in The Player (1992), Dracula (1992) and Goldeneye (1995).

She was awarded two Golden Lions Awards for Best Actress (1999 and 2003) at the Gdynia Film Festival as well as the Eagle Award (2004).

Private life 
She has one son, Aleksander (b. 1987), with former husband Jan Chmielewski. Her first daughter, Koko Claire Figura-Schoenhals, was born 24 October 2002 in New York, USA. Her second daughter, Kaszmir Amber, was born 27 February 2005 in Warsaw, Poland.

Selected filmography

 Zginął pies (1976, Short)
 Mysz (1980, TV Movie)
 Bez końca (1985) - Asystentka hipnotyzera (uncredited)
 Przeznaczenie (1985) - Laura
 Rośliny trujące (1985, TV Movie) - Goga 'Saganka'
 Osobisty pamiętnik grzesznika przez niego samego spisany (1986) - Cyntia
 Ga. Ga. Chwała bohaterom (1986) - Once
 Zkrocení zlého muže (1986)
 Pierścień i róża (1987) - Rózia
 Komediantka (1987) - Mimi Zarzycka
 Pociąg do Hollywood (1987) - Marilyn
 Season of Monsters (1987) - Annabella
 Kingsajz (1988) - Ala
 W klatce (1988) - Marta
 Nebojsa (1989) - Cerná paní
 Estación Central (1989) - Elena
 Rififi po sześćdziesiątce (1989, TV Movie) - Eliza
 Porno (1990) - Superblondyna
 Swinka (1990) - Dolores Mendoza
 Mleczna droga (1991, TV Movie) - The Death
 Panny i wdowy (1991) - Karolina Lechicka
 Obywatel świata (1991)
 L'ambassade en folie (1992) - Sasha Moliniva
 The Player (1992) - Kasia Figura
 Screen Two (1992, TV Series) - Leni
 Wesoła noc smutnego biznesmena (1993, TV Movie)
 Vortice Mortale (1993) - Vida Kolba
 Fatal Past (1994) - Jennifer Lawrence
 Ready to Wear (1994) - Sissy's Assistant
 Wrzeciono czasu (1995) - Matylda
 Too Fast Too Young (1996) - Kaddy Havel
 Germans (1996) - Maritza
 Autoportret z kochanka (1996) - Diana
 Bieg do drzewa (1996)
 Słoneczny zegar (1997)
 Historie miłosne (1997) - Kryska, zona Filipa
 Szcześliwego Nowego Jorku (1997) - Teriza
 Kiler (1997) - Rysia
 Prostytutki (1998) - Grazia
 Złoto dezerterów (1998) - Basia
 Kiler-ów 2-óch (1999) - Rysia, Siara's Wife
 Ajlawju (1999) - Gosia
 Zakochani (2000) - Edyta Bobicka
 Stacja (2001) - Wolanski's wife
 Career of Nikos Dyzma (2002) - Nurse
 The Pianist (2002) - Neighbour
 Zemsta (2002) - Podstolina Hanna
 Żurek (2003) - Halina
 Ubu Król (2003) - Ubica
 We're All Christs (2006) - Registry Office Clerk
 Summer Love (2006) - The Woman
 Aria Diva (2007, Short) - Diva Joanna
  To nie tak, jak myślisz, kotku (2008) - Maria
 Kochaj i tańcz (2008) - Basia - Hania's mother
 The Magic Stone (2009)
 Cudowne lato (2010) - Matka - Aurelia
 Och, Karol (2011) - Judge
 Wyjazd integracyjny (2011) - Mrs. Jadzia
 Yuma (2012) - Halinka
 Komisarz Blond i Oko Sprawiedliwosci (2012) - Lolek Orchiestra
 Bejbi blues (2012) - Neighbour
 Podejrzani zakochani (2013) - 'Fourty'
 Panie Dulskie (2015) - Melania 'Mela'
 Słaba płeć? (2015) - Mother
 Papierowe gody (2017) - Agata's mother
 Ah śpij kochanie (2017) - Ruda
 7 uczuć (2018) - Gosia
 Diablo (2019) - Feliksa
 Nerd (2019) - Norbert's Mom
 Never Gonna Snow Again (2020) - Owner of bulldogs
 Raz, jeszcze raz (2020) - Mother
 Dziewczyny z Dubaju'' (2021) - Dorota

See also
Polish cinema
List of Poles

References

External links

1962 births
Living people
Polish film actresses
Polish television actresses
Aleksander Zelwerowicz National Academy of Dramatic Art in Warsaw alumni
Actresses from Warsaw